Emperor Yizong of Western Xia (1047–1068), sinicized name Li Liangzuo, was the second emperor of the Western Xia dynasty of China, reigning from 1048 to 1067. Yizong was also known by his Tangut name Ningling Liangcha (寧令兩岔). "Ningling" (寧令,) was his Tangut title, which meant "Grand Prince", while "Liangcha" (兩岔) was his personal name.

After the death of his father, Li Yuanhao (Emperor Jingzong) in 1048, Yizong assumed the throne at the age of one, but most of the power laid in the hands of his mother the Empress Dowager. In 1049, the Liao dynasty attacked the Western Xia and forced it to become a vassal state. In 1056, the Dowager was killed and Yizong's uncle, Mozang Epang, became the regent. In 1061, Yizong's uncle and cousin plotted against him, so he had them executed and assumed direct control of the Western Xia.

Yizong expanded the central government, adding many offices. He made the armies more efficient and improved his control over faraway states. Yizong began to attack the Northern Song dynasty and raided their villages. He also forced the Turpan leader to surrender. In later years, Yizong began to improve diplomatic relationships with the Northern Song and Liao dynasties. He died suddenly in 1068.

Family 
Consorts and issues:

 Empress Mozang (皇后沒藏氏, d.1061), daughter of Mozang Epang
 Empress Gongsu (恭肅皇后梁氏, d.1085), personal name Luoyao (落瑤)
Emperor Huizong of Western Xia, personal name Bingchang (秉常)
Princess, married son of Dong Zhan (董毡) Dong Tongbi (董通比)

References

The Ageless Chinese by Dun J. Li

1047 births
1067 deaths
Western Xia emperors
11th-century Chinese monarchs
11th-century Tangut rulers